"Shame Shame" is a song by American rock band Foo Fighters. The song is from the band's tenth studio album, Medicine at Midnight. It was released as the album's first single on November 7, 2020.

Background
Foo Fighters' singer and guitarist Dave Grohl has stated that "Shame Shame" is unlike anything Foo Fighters have ever done before and that the song allowed them to "move into another territory" with their sound on their new album, Medicine at Midnight.

According to the band's bassist Nate Mendel, "Shame Shame" started off as a "just a bunch of clicks from Dave" and originally didn't involve any bass line until he ended up recording extra parts for the song that were ultimately included.

Live performances
Foo Fighters performed "Shame Shame" live for the first time on Saturday Night Live on November 7, 2020. On September 12, 2021 the band performed the song in a medley at 2021 MTV Video Music Awards at the Barclays Center in Brooklyn, when they won the award for Global Icon.

Music video
The music video was directed by Paola Kudacki and features Sofia Boutella. Grohl has stated that it was inspired by an unsettling dream he had as a teenager that he had remembered all his life and said that the video was darker than anything they had done before.

Reception
With 9.3 million audience impressions for "Shame Shame", Foo Fighters took back the record of most number 1's on the Billboard Rock Airplay chart, which also marked the fastest rise to the top of the chart in four years.

Personnel
Credits adapted from Tidal.

Foo Fighters
 Dave Grohl – lead vocals, guitar, producer
 Taylor Hawkins – drums, producer
 Rami Jaffee – keyboards, piano, producer
 Nate Mendel – bass guitar, producer
 Chris Shiflett – guitar, producer
 Pat Smear – guitar, producer

Additional musicians

 Samantha Sidley – background vocals
 Violet Grohl – background vocals
 Barbara Gruska – background vocals
 Laura Mace – background vocals
 Inara George – background vocals
 Jacob Braun - cello
 Greg Kurstin - strings
 Alma Fernandez - viola
 Charlie Bisharat – violin
 Songa Lee – violin

Technical

 Greg Kurstin – producer
 Randy Merrill – mastering engineer
 Mark "Spike" Stent – mixing engineer
 Darrell Thorp – engineer
 Matt Wolach – assistant engineer
 Alex Pasco – assistant engineer

Charts

Weekly charts

Year-end charts

Awards

References

2020 singles
Foo Fighters songs
Songs written by Dave Grohl
2020 songs
RCA Records singles